Out from the Dark is a compiled rehearsal recording by the Norwegian black metal band Mayhem. The album is a recording of a 1989 rehearsal, but it was not officially released until 1996 by Black Metal Records.

This is one of the few releases Mayhem recorded with vocalist Dead, before his 8 April 1991 suicide.

Track listing

Credits
Dead (Per Yngve Ohlin) - vocals
Euronymous (Øystein Aarseth) - guitar
Necrobutcher (Jørn Stubberud) - bass guitar
Hellhammer (Jan Axel Blomberg) - drums

See also
Mayhem discography

Mayhem (band) albums
1996 albums
Demo albums